Lori McNeil and Kimberly Po were the defending champions, but lost in the quarterfinals to Amy Frazier and Katie Schlukebir.

Frazier and Schlukebir went on to win the title, defeating Cara Black and Debbie Graham 6–2, 6–3 in the final.

Seeds

Draw

References
Main Draw

Challenge Bell
Tournoi de Québec
Can